Kirkcaldy was a county constituency of the House of Commons of the Parliament of the United Kingdom in Fife, returning one Member of Parliament (MP). It existed from the February 1974 election until its abolition in 2005.

History
This was a safe Labour seat throughout its existence.

Boundaries
1974–1983: The burghs of Buckhaven and Methil, Burntisland, Kinghorn, and Kirkcaldy, the district of Kirkcaldy (except the electoral divisions of Markinch North and Markinch South) and the district of Wemyss (except the electoral divisions of Kennoway and Scoonie).

1983–1997: The Kirkcaldy District electoral divisions of Auchtertool/Linktown/Invertiel, Bennochy/Chapel/Cluny, Bennochy/Dunearn, Buckhaven/East Wemyss, Burntisland/Kinghorn, Dunnikier, Gallatown/Dysart/Coaltown of Wemyss/Thornton, Hayfield/Kirkcaldy Central, and Smeaton/Sinclairtown.

1997–2005: The Kirkcaldy District electoral divisions of Buckhaven, Thornton and Wemyss; Burntisland and Auchtertool; Dunearn and Torbain; Dunnikier and Fair Isle; Dysart and Gallatown; Hayfield and Bennochy; Kinghorn and Linktown; Pathhead, Sinclairtown and Smeaton; and Raith and Valley.

The constituency was centred on the town of Kirkcaldy. It was created at the February 1974 election, mostly replacing Kirkcaldy Burghs. In 2005 the seat was abolished, being mostly replaced by Kirkcaldy and Cowdenbeath with a small portion becoming part of Glenrothes.

Members of Parliament

Elections

Elections in the 1970s

Elections in the 1980s

Elections in the 1990s

Elections in the 2000s

References

Historic parliamentary constituencies in Scotland (Westminster)
Constituencies of the Parliament of the United Kingdom established in 1974
Constituencies of the Parliament of the United Kingdom disestablished in 2005
Politics of Fife